USS Laboon (DDG-58) is an  in the United States Navy.
She is named for Father John Francis Laboon (1921–1988), a captain in the Chaplain Corps of the United States Navy, who was awarded the Silver Star during World War II while serving on the submarine .

Construction and career
Laboon keel was laid down on 23 March 1992 at the Bath Iron Works shipyard in Bath, Maine. She was launched on 20 February 1993. Laboon was commissioned on 18 March 1995, commanded by CDR Douglas D. McDonald. In the fall of 1996, she fired Tomahawk missiles at targets in Iraq, thus becoming the first Arleigh Burke-class destroyer to engage in combat.

In 1998, Laboon took part in NATO Exercise Dynamic Response 98, together with 's Amphibious Ready Group.

On 12 September 2012, Laboon was ordered to the coast of Libya in what the Pentagon called a "contingency" in case a strike was ordered. This was in response to the 2012 diplomatic missions attacks.

On 21 June 2015, Laboon entered the Black Sea along with the French ship  as part of NATO's presence missions following the Annexation of Crimea by the Russian Federation. While in the Black Sea, Laboon participated in joint maneuvers with a Romanian Navy  for two days beginning on 22 June 2015. On 27 June 2015, Laboon began a two-day visit to the Black Sea port of Batumi, Georgia to participate in training with the Coast Guard of Georgia and offer tours of the ship.

On 14 April 2018, she fired seven Tomahawk missiles from a position in the Red Sea as part of a bombing campaign in retaliation for the Syrian government's use of chemical weapons against people in Douma.

References

External links

 USS Laboon official website.  Retrieved 2010-07-27.

 

Arleigh Burke-class destroyers
Destroyers of the United States
Ships built in Bath, Maine
1993 ships